Morafenobe is a district in western Madagascar. It is a part of Melaky Region and borders the districts of Besalampy in north, Ambatomainty in east, Miandrivazo in south, Antsalova in southwest and Maintirano in west.

Communes
The district is further divided into four communes:

 Andramy
 Antranokoaky
 Beravina
 Morafenobe

References and notes

Districts of Melaky